James Anthony Morrow Sr. (March 12, 1892 - April 10, 1967) was an American Democratic politician. He was a member of the Mississippi House of Representatives from 1936 to 1944.

Biography 
James Anthony Morrow was born on March 12, 1892, near Okolona, Chickasaw County, Mississippi. He fought for the United States in World War I. He represented Rankin County in the Mississippi House of Representatives from 1936 to 1944. He died on April 10, 1967, in Mississippi.

Personal life and family 
Morrow's son, James Anthony Morrow Jr., was a member of the Mississippi House of Representatives from 1952 to 1988. Morrow Sr. also had a daughter named Eunice. His brother, Robert, became the State Treasurer of Mississippi.

References 

1892 births
1967 deaths
Democratic Party members of the Mississippi House of Representatives
People from Brandon, Mississippi